Latvia, following its independence from the Soviet Union, made its Paralympic Games début at the 1992 Summer Paralympics in Barcelona, with a delegation of two athletes (Armands Lizbovskis and Aldis Supulnieks) in track and field. It then sent Supulnieks as its sole representative to the 1994 Winter Paralympics, for its Winter Games début. (He competed in cross-country skiing.) Latvia has taken part in every subsequent edition of the Summer Paralympics, but missed the 1998 and 2002 Winter Games, appearing with a one-man delegation in 2006, before being absent again in 2010.

Latvians have won a total of 20 Paralympic medals, of which five gold, seven silver and eight bronze. All these medals have been won at the Summer Games, and all in track and field.

The country obtained its first medals in 2000 in Sydney, when Aigars Apinis took bronze in both the discus and the shot put (F52 category). Latvia's third medal of the Sydney Games was also a bronze, through Armands Lizbovskis in the long jump (F13). These were Lizbovskis' third and last Games. In 2004, Apinis became Latvia's first Paralympic champion when he won the F52 discus event, establishing a new Paralympic record with a throw of 18.98m. At the same Games, Edgars Bergs took silver in the shot put and bronze in the discus (F35). In 2008, Apinis and Bergs were again Latvia's sole medal winners. The former won gold in the discus (with a world record throw of 20.47m) and silver in the shot put (F33/34/52), while the latter also won silver in the shot put (F35/36). Until, the 2016 Games, Apinis remained as Latvia's only Paralympic champion to date.

Medal tallies

Summer Paralympics

Winter Paralympics

List of medalists

Summer Olympics

See also
 Latvia at the Olympics

References

 
Paralympics